The 2005 Zurich Open was a women's tennis tournament played on indoor hard courts. It was the 22nd edition of the event known as the Zurich Open, and was part of the Tier I Series of the 2002 WTA Tour. It took place at the Hallenstadion in Zürich, Switzerland, from 17 October through 23 October 2002. First-seeded Lindsay Davenport won the singles title.

Finals

Singles

 Lindsay Davenport defeated  Patty Schnyder, 7–6(7–5), 6–3

Doubles

 Cara Black /  Rennae Stubbs defeated  Daniela Hantuchová /  Ai Sugiyama, 6–7(6–8), 7–6(7–4), 6–3

External links
 Official website 
 WTA draws

Zurich Open
Zurich Open
2005 in Swiss tennis
2005 in Swiss women's sport